Florentina Kolgeci (born 30 October 2000) is a Kosovan professional footballer who plays as a goalkeeper for Kosovan club Mitrovica and the Kosovo national team.

Career
Kolgeci has been capped for the Kosovo national team, appearing for the team during the 2019 FIFA Women's World Cup qualifying cycle.

See also
List of Kosovo women's international footballers

References

External links
 
 
 

2000 births
Living people
Kosovan women's footballers
Kosovo women's international footballers
Women's association football goalkeepers
KFF Mitrovica players
KFF Hajvalia players